Patterson's Archeological District is a  archaeological site near Wallville in Calvert County, Maryland at the mouth of St. Leonard's Creek, the largest tributary of the tidal portions of the Patuxent River.  It contains a representative sample of a range of archeological sites characteristic of both upland and lowland utilization of the Chesapeake Bay tidewater region during the prehistoric and historic periods. The property also contains a range of historic sites.

It was listed on the National Register of Historic Places in 1982. This district is a component of Jefferson Patterson Park & Museum.

References

External links
, including undated photo, at Maryland Historical Trust

Historic districts on the National Register of Historic Places in Maryland
Calvert County, Maryland
Archaeological sites on the National Register of Historic Places in Maryland
National Register of Historic Places in Calvert County, Maryland